Aman Singh Dhaliwal (born 24 July 1986) is an Indian model-turned-actor, who works in Punjabi cinema, where he is known as action hero. He is from the city of Mansa, Punjab. Best known for his changing looks with each role, he has worked in Bollywood, Pollywood, Pakistani and Telugu movies including Big Brother (2007), Jodhaa Akbar (2008), Virsa (2010), Ik Kudi Punjab Di (2010) and Ajj De Ranjhe (2012).

Early life and background
Aman Dhaliwal was born to Mithu Singh Kahneke and Gurtej Kaur Dhaliwal, both teachers. He spent his young life in Mansa, a small rural town in Punjab, India. He received his Bachelors in radiology and Masters in Hospital administration from a Medical college in Delhi, India.

Acting career 
Aman Dhaliwal was discovered by a modeling agent in a hair saloon in Delhi. He started his modeling career in the songs Jaan Jaan by Balkar Sidhu and Jogiya by Romey Gill (2003). His acting career started with Jodha Akbar under the direction of Ashutosh Gowarikar. Dhaliwal has worked under a variety of directors including Gurbir Grewal, Pankaj Batra and Manmohan Singh/Manji.

Filmography

SERIAL TV

Modeling

References

External links 
 
 Aman Dhaliwal on facebook 

1986 births
Living people
Indian male film actors
Indian male models
21st-century Indian male actors
Male actors in Hindi cinema
Male actors in Punjabi cinema
Male actors from Punjab, India